The Type 680 training ship with NATO reporting name Dadu, otherwise known as Qi Jiguang is a training ship of the People's Liberation Army Navy. It joined the PLA Navy on 21 February 2017.

Construction and career  
The type 680 engaged in a number of training voyages around the Indo-Pacific Region in 2019, notably visiting Wellington in New Zealand between 22–26 October. Rear Admiral Yu Wenbing invited various New Zealanders to a courtesy reception scheduled for 29 October 2019. Victoria University of Wellington staff discussed whether it was appropriate to attend the reception; in the event, Assistant Vice-Chancellor Rebecca Needham, a former director of the VUW Confucius Institute, attended the event, along with several staff members of the university's Confucius Institute attended. The New Zealand Defence Force said the visit had been arranged through normal diplomatic channels.

Gallery

References

Training ships of the People's Liberation Army Navy
Auxiliary ships of the People's Liberation Army Navy
2017 ships
Ships built in China
Auxiliary training ship classes

zh:戚继光号训练舰